Walter Lovejoy Dexter (December 19, 1841 – June 17, 1920) was an American farmer and politician.

Born in the town of Pleasant Prairie, Kenosha County, Wisconsin, Dexter was a farmer. He served as chairman of the Pleasant Prairie Town Board and as town treasurer. In 1878, Dexter served in the Wisconsin State Assembly and was a Democrat. Later, he served as sheriff of Kenosha County. Dexter died at his home in Pleasant Prairie.

Notes

External links

1841 births
1920 deaths
People from Pleasant Prairie, Wisconsin
Farmers from Wisconsin
Mayors of places in Wisconsin
Wisconsin sheriffs
Democratic Party members of the Wisconsin State Assembly